The Battle of Grönvikssund was fought between Sweden and Russia during the Finnish War 1808-09.

Battle
Johan Ludvig Brant was tasked with defeating Russian coastal forces operating near Nystad (fi. Uusikaupunki). When he learned that roughly twenty Russian gun sloops or yawls had sailed from Nystad towards Turku he started chasing them. Swedish naval unit caught up with the Russians who upon noticing the approaching Swedes formed for battle. Swedish numerical superiority allowed them to attempt flanking maneuver around the island dominating the battle area, however Russians noticed it and managed to block the flankers.

As flanking had failed approached Swedish to close range however though outnumbered Russian force made fierce resistance and withdrew only slowly while maintaining unit cohesion. When he was running out of ammo Selivanoff had to order retreat at 19:00 when most of his ships had already been shot full of holes. Swedes gave chase to the retreating Russians but failed to catch them before nightfall and turned back.

Numerical superiority and favorable wind were important factors contributing to the Swedish victory. However Swedes' decision to avoid boarding actions probably saved Russians from even greater losses. Swedish victory forced Russians to postpone their plans for attacking Åland and instead of forming a landing force Russian coastal forces were used to protect supply convoys.

References

Bibliography

Gronvikssund
Grönvikssund
Grönvikssund
History of Southwest Finland
1808 in Sweden
Conflicts in 1808
August 1808 events